Gellonia dejectaria, the brown evening moth, is a moth in the family Geometridae. The species was first described by Francis Walker in 1860. It is endemic to New Zealand.

G. dejectaria larvae eat the leaves of the māhoe, supplejack and bush lawyer plants.

References 

Ennominae
Moths of New Zealand
Endemic fauna of New Zealand
Taxa named by Francis Walker (entomologist)
Moths described in 1860
Endemic moths of New Zealand